The One Nation Conservatives is a UK parliamentary caucus of Conservative Party Members of Parliament who identify as one-nation conservatives.

History 
In March 2019, the caucus was formed by a group of between 40 and 50 Conservative MPs. Nicky Morgan and Amber Rudd were announced as co-chairs of the caucus, and Damian Green and Nicholas Soames as board members. The One Nation group was reportedly set up in order to unite MPs around a candidate in the upcoming leadership election who would oppose withdrawing from the European Union without a deal.

On 4 June 2019, the caucus hosted the first leadership election hustings, held across two nights. Both events featured 4 different candidates; the first was chaired by Katy Balls (deputy political editor of The Spectator) and the second by Matt Forde.

Following Boris Johnson's election as party leader and appointment as Prime Minister, both co-chairs were given positions in his government. Morgan became the new Culture Secretary and Rudd carried on in her role as Work and Pensions Secretary. As a result, they both resigned the chairmanship and were succeeded by Damian Green.

On 3 September 2019, 21 Conservative MPs had the party whip withdrawn after voting in support of an emergency motion to enable the passage of the European Union (Withdrawal) (No. 2) Act 2019, also known as the "Benn Act". The One Nation caucus released a statement soon after, demanding that the whip be restored.

In October, a delegation of caucus members met the Prime Minister in 10 Downing Street to discuss the party's position on a no-deal Brexit at the next general election. Following the meeting, Green announced that Johnson had 'looked him in the eye' and assured them that the next Conservative manifesto would not include a no-deal pledge. It was reported that a number of Cabinet ministers and backbench MPs would be willing to resign in the event that such a manifesto commitment were made.

Declaration of Values 
In May 2019, the caucus published a "Declaration of Values", covering a range of domestic, economic and foreign policy issues.

Membership 

It is estimated that the caucus consists of approximately 110 Conservative MPs. Although a full list of members has not been made public, individual MPs have been identified by the press. They include:

Leadership

See also 
 Tory Reform Group
 European Research Group
Moderates

References

External links 
 

Centre-right politics in the United Kingdom
Liberal conservatism
Conservative Party (UK) factions
Centrism in the United Kingdom
Groups of British MPs
Organisations associated with the Conservative Party (UK)
Organizations established in 2019
One-nation conservatism